Lawson Heights is a census-designated place (CDP) in Unity Township, Westmoreland County, Pennsylvania, United States. The population was 2,339 at the 2000 census.

Geography
Lawson Heights is located at  (40.293713, -79.385312).

Demographics

At the 2000 census there were 2,339 people, 1,018 households, and 701 families living in the CDP. The population density was 1,524.4 people per square mile (590.3/km). There were 1,064 housing units at an average density of 693.5/sq mi (268.5/km).  The racial makeup of the CDP was 98.80% White, 0.21% African American, 0.13% Native American, 0.21% Asian, 0.04% Pacific Islander, 0.04% from other races, and 0.56% from two or more races. Hispanic or Latino of any race were 0.43%.

Of the 1,018 households 21.0% had children under the age of 18 living with them, 58.2% were married couples living together, 7.9% had a female householder with no husband present, and 31.1% were non-families. 29.2% of households were one person and 17.2% were one person aged 65 or older. The average household size was 2.24 and the average family size was 2.73.

The age distribution was 17.9% under the age of 18, 5.6% from 18 to 24, 22.7% from 25 to 44, 25.8% from 45 to 64, and 28.0% 65 or older. The median age was 48 years. For every 100 females, there were 88.6 males. For every 100 females age 18 and over, there were 84.2 males.

The median household income was $37,158 and the median family income  was $49,766. Males had a median income of $37,989 versus $25,125 for females. The per capita income for the CDP was $19,027. About 4.4% of families and 6.5% of the population were below the poverty line, including 9.4% of those under age 18 and 7.9% of those age 65 or over.

See also
Census-designated places in Pennsylvania

References

Census-designated places in Westmoreland County, Pennsylvania
Pittsburgh metropolitan area
Census-designated places in Pennsylvania